Si Mamad is a 1973 Indonesian comedy film directed by Sjuman Djaya. The 
film won two awards at the Indonesian Film Festival in 1974.

Awards

References 

Indonesian-language films
1973 films
Indonesian comedy films